The 2014 Red Bull Air Race World Championship was the ninth season of Red Bull Air Race World Championship, and the first since 2010.

In his seventh season in the series, British pilot Nigel Lamb became the champion for the first time, with consistent finishing being the key to his championship success. After starting the season slowly with just five points from the opening two events, Lamb won his first Air Race competition at Putrajaya Lake in Malaysia, before reeling off five consecutive second-place finishes. These results were good enough for him to surpass former champions Hannes Arch and Paul Bonhomme in the standings; Lamb ultimately finished nine points clear of Arch, with Bonhomme a further two points in arrears. Both pilots won two races during the season, as Arch won at Rovinj, Croatia and at Gdynia in Poland, while Bonhomme won in Abu Dhabi and his home event, at Ascot Racecourse. Nicolas Ivanoff was another two-time event winner, winning at Texas Motor Speedway and the Red Bull Ring, with Pete McLeod winning the remaining event, at Las Vegas Motor Speedway.

The series also introduced a Challenger Cup for the 2014 season, for young pilots to develop their skills. Each pilot entered at least three races in order to accrue points towards the Cup rankings, with the top six pilots after the Las Vegas event being invited to a winner-takes-all event at the Red Bull Ring. Petr Kopfstein won the race by 1.1 seconds over Halim Othman, to take the inaugural title.

Starting in 2014 it was sanctioned by the Fédération Aéronautique Internationale (FAI) as an official motorsport, meaning provision of FAI medals especially designed for the Red Bull Air Race, the inclusion of all races in the FAI Events Calendar, and the official approval by the FAI of the race Rules & Regulations. Also, the FAI provided a safety delegate who attended all events to supervise safety aspects.

Aircraft and pilots

Master Class

Challenger Class

 All Challenger Cup Pilots used an Extra 330LX.

Three new pilots (Bolton, Czepiela and Othman) earned race wings and officially joined the Challenger Class on April 5, 2014, after they surpassed rigorous training and testing which took place at the Red Bull Air Race Qualification Camp in Murska Sobota, Slovenia.

Race calendar and results

The eight-event calendar for the 2014 season. An updated race calendar was released on 15 July, with the scheduled Chinese round being replaced by a round at the Red Bull Ring in Spielberg, Austria.

Notes

Championship standings

Master Class

Master Class scoring system

Challenger Class
Challenger Class pilots competed in at least three races throughout the season, with each pilot's best three scores counting towards the Challenger Cup ranking. The top six pilots in the ranking qualified for a winner-takes-all race at the Red Bull Ring.

Ranking
Challenger Class scoring system

Final
At the last race of the season in Austria, the top six pilots in the standings took part in a race to determine the final ranking of the Challenger Cup.

References

External links

 

 
Red Bull Air Race World Championship seasons
Red Bull Air Race
Red Bull Air Race